Jalan Jengka 21, Federal Route 1547, is a main federal road in Bandar Pusat Jengka, Pahang, Malaysia.

At most sections, the Federal Route 1547 was built under the JKR R5 road standard, with a speed limit of 90 km/h.

List of junctions

Malaysian Federal Roads